Boginja Vas is a small settlement south of Gradac in the Municipality of Metlika in the White Carniola area of southeastern Slovenia. The entire area is part of the traditional region of Lower Carniola and is now included in the Southeast Slovenia Statistical Region.

Name
Boginja Vas was attested in written sources as Wogindarff  in 1438 and Wochenstorf in 1490.

References

External links

Boginja Vas on Geopedia

Populated places in the Municipality of Metlika